The 2006 Euro Beach Soccer League – Last chance bracket, simply known as the Last chance bracket was an additional round of the 2006 Euro Beach Soccer League (EBSL) that was specially organised to determine the fifth and final European nation that would qualify for the 2006 FIFA Beach Soccer World Cup.

The event was organised by Beach Soccer Worldwide (BSWW), in parallel with the staging of the 2006 EBSL Superfinal, taking place during the same dates (24–27 August) and in the same location of Marsielle, France.

Five berths were allocated to European teams in the 2006 FIFA Beach Soccer World Cup, four of which were filled when Portugal, Spain, Italy and Poland reached the semi-finals of the Superfinal. This meant there was still one final berth at the World Cup to be filled. In order to decide which nation would get this fifth and final spot at the World Cup, BSWW decided the prospective nations would compete in a knockout tournament called the Last chance bracket, with the winner claiming the final World Cup ticket. 

France won the event by beating Switzerland in the final and claimed the last remaining World Cup berth.

Teams
This round of the 2006 EBSL was a distinctly separate and unique event from the regular structure of the league, but nevertheless related to the league since it involved inviting back all the teams previously knocked out of World Cup qualifying contention during this year's EBSL to compete in the event for a second chance at qualification, as well as four wild-card entries, as listed below.

From Division B
These nations finished in 5th through 9th in Division B, failing to qualify for Division A

From Division A
These nations finished in 7th and 8th place in Division A, failing to qualify for the Superfinal

From the Superfinal
These nations finished in 5th and 6th in the Superfinal

Wild-cards
These nations had not yet competed in this year's EBSL until this point (bar Russia)

1

1. Russia initially competed in Division B, but were disqualified from competing any further mid-season.

Results
The success of teams in this season's EBSL also affected what round the nations began their last chance bracket campaign's in as follows:

With the least credentials, the four wild cards and four Division B teams who failed to qualify into Division A, were drawn against each other and started in the first round.

With the most credentials, the two Division A nations who failed to make the Superfinal, and the two who were knocked out in the group stage of the Superfinal, received a bye in the first round, and entered straight into the quarter finals

Main bracket

Consolation matches

Final standings

Source

World Cup qualifiers
The following table shows the five nations qualified to the 2006 World Cup and their qualification route.

Sources

 Roonba
 RSSSF

Euro Beach Soccer League
2006 in beach soccer
2006 FIFA Beach Soccer World Cup